Miscellaneous Babylonian Inscriptions is a 1918, Sumerian linguistics and mythology book written by George Aaron Barton.

It was first published by Yale University Press in the United States and deals with commentary and translations of twelve cuneiform, Sumerian myths and texts discovered by the University of Pennsylvania Museum of Archaeology and Anthropology excavations at the temple library at Nippur. Many of the texts are extremely archaic, especially the Barton Cylinder, which Samuel Noah Kramer suggested may date as early as 2500 BC. A more modern dating by Joan Goodnick Westenholz has suggested the cylinder dates to around 2400 BC.

Contents

Some of the myths contained in the book are shown below:

References

External links
Barton, George Aaron., Miscellaneous Babylonian Inscriptions, Yale University Press, 1918. Online Version

1918 non-fiction books
American non-fiction books
Linguistics books
Hymnals
Essay collections
Oral history books
Public domain books
Sumer
Archaeology books
Sumerian texts